Martha Rina Victoria Roldós Bucaram (Guayaquil, Ecuador; 1963) is an Ecuadorian economist and politician. Her parents were the former president of the Republic Jaime Roldós Aguilera and Martha Bucaram, who both died in a plane crash in Loja Province in 1981.

She has been a deputy of the National Congress and the Ecuadorian Constituent Assembly, representing the Ethics and Democracy Network party, which is led by her uncle León Roldós Aguilera. She was a candidate for President  of the Republic in the presidential elections of the 2009, running with Eduardo Thin.

See also 
 Presidential elections of Ecuador of 2009

External links 
 Official website of the National Assembly of Ecuador - Profile of Martha Roldós

Members of the National Congress (Ecuador)
1963 births
Living people
Ecuadorian people of Lebanese descent
21st-century Ecuadorian women politicians
21st-century Ecuadorian politicians
20th-century Ecuadorian economists
Ecuadorian women economists
21st-century Ecuadorian economists
People from Guayaquil